Taloqan (Persian, also transcribed Taleqan or Taluqan) is the capital of Takhar Province, in northeastern Afghanistan. It is located in the Taluqan District. The population was estimated as 196,400 in 2006.

In 2021, the Taliban gained control of the province during the 2021 Taliban offensive.

History

The old city to the west on the riverside was described by Marco Polo in 1275 CE as:

"a castle called Taikhan, where there is a great corn-market, and the country round is fine and fruitful. The hills that lie to the south of it are large and lofty. They all consist of white salt, extremely hard, with which the people for a distance of thirty days' journey round, come to provide themselves, for it is esteemed the purest that is found in the world. It is so hard, that it can be broken only with great iron hammers. The quantity is so great that all the countries of the earth might be supplied from thence."

In 1603, Taloqan ("Talhan") was visited by another European explorer, Bento de Góis, who was traveling with a caravan from Kabul to Yarkand (then the capital of Kashgaria).

Recent history

The mujahideen headquarters of Ahmad Shah Massoud were located in Taloqan during his campaign against the Soviet Army and the Taliban. Taloqan was the last major city to fall to the Taliban, on 5 September 2000, after a siege which claimed the lives of hundreds of civilians. A bloody capture by the Taliban also triggered a mass exodus in the population, with civilians fleeing towards Imam Sahib and the Panjshir Valley. Northern Alliance soldiers managed to stop the Taliban advance to the north and to the east of the city, but weren't able to retake it. Taloqan was liberated in November 2001 by Northern Alliance soldiers following the United States invasion of Afghanistan. 

The city was attacked during the 2021 Taliban offensive (which coincided with the withdrawal of United States troops). 

On May 2, 2021, PiramQul Ziayi, the most influential anti-Taliban figure in Takhar, was assassinated in Rustaq district.

Following the fall of several districts of Takhar to the Taliban , on June 20, 2021, a group of Takhar elders Including Mohibullah Noori one of Takhar elders and Ashraf Ani a member of Parliament announced at a press conference in Kabul that they will send a group to mobilize people resistant in support of security forces in Takhar. Mohibullah Noori led the group entered the Taloqan City on June 26, 2021 and united the Takhar commanders to resist against Taliban.

The Taliban tried to take the city in July 2021, however the attack was repulsed. later During Taliban offensive Haji Agha Gol Qatghani was killed and Khair Mohammad Teymour injured and all forces, including provincial officials, retreated to the Versaj district. Taloqan was captured by the Taliban on 8 August 2021.

Taloqan in Islamic sources
The testament of the Islamic prophet Muhammad indicates that the city will play a major role regarding the Mahdi. A narration by chain, Imam Baqir states: "Allah Almighty has a treasure in Talaqan which is of neither gold nor silver, but consists of twelve thousand (people), having “Ahmad, Ahmad” for their slogan. They will be led by a young Hashemite man riding a gray mule and wearing a red headband. It is as if I can see him crossing the Euphrates. Should you hear of his coming, rush to him even if you have to crawl over the snow. Another narration states: "Talaqan is a place of treasures of Allah. These treasures are not of gold and silver, but consist of people who have recognised Allah as they should have."

Climate
Taloqan has a Mediterranean climate (Köppen climate classification Csa). In winter there is more rainfall than in summer. About  of precipitation falls annually.

See also 
 Taluqan District
Taloqan Airport
 Cities of Afghanistan
 Takhar Province
 Tokharistan

References

External links
 Photos of Taloqan on TrekEarth.com

Populated places in Takhar Province
Cities in Afghanistan
Provincial capitals in Afghanistan
Populated places with period of establishment missing